Radomir Reljić (1938 - 6 November 2006), was a Serbian painter, a professor of the Faculty of Fine Arts in Belgrade, and a member of SANU.

References 

1938 births
2006 deaths
Members of the Serbian Academy of Sciences and Arts
20th-century Serbian painters
Serbian male painters
20th-century Serbian male artists